Lyclene pudibunda is a moth of the subfamily Arctiinae. It was described by Pieter Cornelius Tobias Snellen in 1880. It is found on Sumatra and Borneo and in the north-eastern Himalayas. It is found in a wide range of habitats, including secondary vegetation, dipterocarp forests and heath forests in the lowlands, as well as lower montane forests.

References

Nudariina
Moths described in 1880
Moths of Asia